Bulgaralpine was a sports automobile produced in Plovdiv, Bulgaria, and the result of a collaboration between Alpine (a French automobile firm) and ETO Bulet (a Bulgarian export trade organisation). Production lasted for three years (1967–1969).

The beginnings

In the end of 1966 the founder of the French car company Alpine – Jean Rédélé – arrived in Sofia, Bulgaria, having been invited by the ETO (export trade organisation) Bulet. Bulet was the same Bulgarian firm that had, through cooperation with Renault, already began the assembly of Bulgarrenault, and now had the same intention regarding Alpine. While in Bulgaria, Rédélé was introduced to the famed Bulgarian car racer Iliya Chubrikov, who was given the opportunity to test-drive the Alpine A110 on the Circle Highway (at that time still in construction) around Sofia. Building on the good impressions made by his car, Rédélé made an attractive offer of cooperation to the Bulgarian side, and in early 1967 sent to Bulgaria several of his 1,000-cubic centimetres-displacement engines, two of which were installed into Bulgarrenault 8 bodies. Later that year, Iliya Chubrikov won first place in the Transbalkania rally. Shortly after that, Rédélé sent his engineering team to Bulgaria to prepare the assembly of Bulgaralpine and to train a Bulgarian team of automotive specialists. Iliya Chubrikov was hired by ETO Bulet in the capacity of a production manager for sports cars.

Initial production and racing

In order to manufacture the fiberglass bodies, Bulgaria licensed the manufacturing method for a payment of 8 million French francs which secured the necessary machinery and tooling. The raw material for the manufacture of the fibreglass was initially imported from France, but later came from the GDR (East Germany) and Poland.

The first several Bulgaralpines were assembled at the end of 1967 when the stunning sports car was an absolute hit in Europe and the United States, which of course gave a great deal of pride to Bulgaria. In 1968, two Bulgaralpine race cars, driven by the teams of Iliya and Nikola Chubrikov, and Atanas Taskov and Atanas Agura, took part in the Monte Carlo Rally for the very first time. For publicity purposes, ETO Bulet created an auto racing team of its own, composed by the brothers Chubrikov, the brothers Agura, Robert Kyurkchiev, Slavcho Georgiev and Atanas Taskov. The short-lived team nonetheless proved popular both in Bulgaria and abroad. All Bulgaralpine racecars were decommissioned after 1978 and never took part in another rally again.

The production run and the end
Bulgaralpine was not intended for the mass consumer in Bulgaria, instead being aimed at sports clubs and racing teams. However, some well-to-do consumers, such as the well-known Bulgarian film director Vassil Mirchev, bought a Bulgaralpine for private use. In 1969, Mirchev attended the Cannes film festival, covering the distance between Sofia, Bulgaria, and Cannes, France, in 16 hours in his Bulgaralpine. The price of Bulgaralpine in 1969 was 8,200 Bulgarian leva.

The initial intentions were to produce one Bulgaralpine car per day, but even now it is difficult to say how many Bulgaralpines were built when production ended in 1969. Some sources state that only 60 cars were completed, others mention 120 (70 for sale in Bulgaria, and 50 - for export). The production manager and race car driver Iliya Chubrikov recalls about 100 completed cars, none of which were exported beyond Bulgaria's borders.

Links
2013-Renault - Inter Expo Center Sofia

Defunct manufacturing companies of Bulgaria
Car manufacturers of Bulgaria
Sports car manufacturers
Cars introduced in 1967
Economy of Plovdiv
History of Plovdiv